The 2021 Alamo Bowl was a college football bowl game played on December 29, 2021, with kickoff at 9:15 p.m. EST (8:15 p.m. local CST) and televised on ESPN. It was the 29th edition of the Alamo Bowl, and was one of the 2021–22 bowl games concluding the 2021 FBS football season. Sponsored by Valero Energy, the game was officially known as the Valero Alamo Bowl.

Teams
Consistent with conference tie-ins, the game was played between teams from the Pac-12 Conference and the Big 12 Conference. This was the eighth meeting between the programs; entering the bowl, Oklahoma led the all-time series 6–1 as Oregon's lone win came in 2006 at home.

Oregon Ducks

Oregon completed their regular seasons with a 10–2 record (7–2 in Pac-12 play) then lost the Pac-12 Championship Game to Utah, whom they had previously lost to during the season. The Ducks entered the bowl with a 10–3 record; their only other loss was to Stanford. As head coach Mario Cristobal left the Oregon program to join the Miami Hurricanes in early December, Bryan McClendon was named interim head coach of the Ducks for the bowl game.

Oklahoma Sooners

Oklahoma completed their regular season with an overall 10–2 record, 7–2 in Big 12 games. After starting their season with nine consecutive wins, the Sooners lost two of their final three games, to Baylor and Oklahoma State. Due to the departure of Lincoln Riley from the Oklahoma program (he was named head coach at USC), former Sooner head coach Bob Stoops was named to lead the team in their bowl game.

Game summary

Statistics

References

External links
 Game statistics at statbroadcast.com

Alamo Bowl
Alamo Bowl
Oregon Ducks football bowl games
Oklahoma Sooners football bowl games
Alamo Bowl
Alamo Bowl